Carl Tadeus Fletcher (born 26 December 1971) is a former professional Canadian soccer defender who played in the Canadian Soccer League, USL A-League, and played at the international level appearing in several CONCACAF Gold Cup tournaments and at the 2001 FIFA Confederations Cup.

Club career
Fletcher began his professional career for the Toronto Blizzard of the Canadian Soccer League. He played for the Toronto Rockets in 1994, which was the club's only season of existence. He spent the 1996 indoor season with Toronto Shooting Stars of the National Professional Soccer League. When the indoor season ended he signed with Montreal Impact and played a total of 68 matches. In 1999, he signed a contract with Hampton Roads Mariners and played two years with the team. Fletcher returned to the Montreal Impact in April 2001. After playing half a season with the Impact, he was sold to Rochester Raging Rhinos in August 2001. With Rochester he reached the postseason, and captured the A-League championship.

In 2002, Fletcher was transferred to the Atlanta Silverbacks, where he spent two seasons, that of 2002 being his best when the team reached the first round of the playoffs. In 2004 Fletcher took a season off to pursue a broadcast career with TSN. A year after he decided to return to soccer and signed with his hometown club the Toronto Lynx. His signing was announced on March 31, 2005. He failed to make an appearance for the club due to sustaining an injury early in the season and was released halfway through the season.

International career
Fletcher made his first steps on the international scene at the 1987 FIFA U-16 World Championship which were held in Canada. He played in all three games there.

He made his senior debut for Canada in a July 1991 CONCACAF Gold Cup match against Jamaica and for a couple of years was the first-choice defender for the Canadian national team. He earned 40 caps, scoring twice. He represented Canada in 7 World Cup qualifiers.

His last international game was on 1 June 2003 against Germany.

International goals
Scores and results list Canada's goal tally first.

References

External links
 
 

1971 births
Living people
Soccer players from Toronto
Naturalized citizens of Canada
Black Canadian soccer players
Association football defenders
Canadian soccer players
Canada men's international soccer players
CONCACAF Gold Cup-winning players
1991 CONCACAF Gold Cup players
1996 CONCACAF Gold Cup players
2000 CONCACAF Gold Cup players
2001 FIFA Confederations Cup players
2002 CONCACAF Gold Cup players
Canadian expatriate soccer players
Canadian expatriate sportspeople in the United States
Toronto Blizzard (1986–1993) players
Toronto Rockets players
Montreal Impact (1992–2011) players
Virginia Beach Mariners players
Rochester New York FC players
Atlanta Silverbacks players
Toronto Lynx players
Canadian Soccer League (1987–1992) players
American Professional Soccer League players
A-League (1995–2004) players
Expatriate soccer players in the United States
Canada men's youth international soccer players
Toronto Shooting Stars players
National Professional Soccer League (1984–2001) players